The Social Justice Committee of Montreal (SJCM) is a non-governmental organisation and registered charity in Canada. It works to address social injustice directed at the world's impoverished peoples.

History
SJCM was founded in 1975 by Ernest Schibli.  Although Schibli was at the time attached to the office of the Auxiliary Bishop of the Archdiocese of Montreal, the group claimed no denominational affiliation and worked with various Christian and non-Christian churches and groups to raise awareness of the social ills facing the poor of Central America.

Currently, the organisation has three main areas of focus: Third World debt relief, mining and corporate accountability, and IMF and World Bank reform.

The SJC also publishes educational toolkits and organizes a social justice theatre program.

References

External links
 

Non-profit organizations based in Montreal
Social justice organizations